Dinesh Sharma may refer to:
Dinesh Sharma (politician) (born 1964), Indian politician
Dinesh Sharma (academic), social scientist, psychologist and author
Dinesh Sharma (actor) (born 1970), Nepalese film actor, producer and director